The 2017 European Juniors Wrestling Championships was held in Dortmund, Germany between June 27 - July 2, 2017.

Medal table

Team ranking

Medal summary

Men's freestyle

Men's Greco-Roman

Women's freestyle

References 

Wrestling
European Wrestling Juniors Championships
Sports competitions in Dortmund
European Juniors Wrestling Championships